The following cathedrals, churches and chapels are dedicated to Saint Nicholas:

Austria
Church of St. Nikolaus, Lockenhaus
St. Nicholas Church, Inzersdorf, Vienna

Albania
St. Nicholas Church, Moscopole
St. Nicholas Church, Perondi
Church of St. Nicholas (Shelcan)

Belgium
Saint Nicholas Church, Ghent

Bulgaria
Church of St Nicholas, Sapareva Banya
Russian Church, Sofia
Church of St. Nicholas, Sofia
Church of St Nicholas, Vukovo

Canada
St. Nicholas Macedonian Orthodox Church, Windsor, Ontario

Croatia
Church of St. Nicholas, Rijeka

Czech Republic
St. Nicholas Church (Lesser Town), Prague
St. Nicholas Church (Old Town), Prague
St. Nicholas Church, Louny
St. Nicholas Church (Vršovice)

Denmark
St. Nicolai Church (Vejle)
St. Nicholas Church, Aarhus

Greenland
St Nicholas Cathedral, Garðar

Estonia
St. Nicholas Church, Tallinn
St. Nicholas Orthodox Church, Tallinn

Finland
St. Nicholas Church, former name of Helsinki Cathedral
St. Nicholas Church, Kotka
St. Nicholas Cathedral, Kuopio

France
Saint-Nicolas-du-Chardonnet, Paris
Saint Nicolas Church, Toulouse
Saint Nicholas Church, Strasbourg
Saint Nicholas Chapel on the Pont Saint-Bénézet, Avignon

Germany
St. Nicholas Church, Berlin
St. Nicholas Church, Hamburg
St. Nikolai, Kiel
Steindamm Church, Königsberg
St. Nicholas Church, Leipzig
St. Nicolai, Lüneburg
St. Nicholas Church, Potsdam
Schelf Church, Schwerin
St. Nicholas Church, Stralsund
St. Nicholas Church, Wismar

Greece
Church of Saint Nicholas Orphanos, Thessaloniki

Hungary
Church of St. Nicholas, Szeged

Iran
St. Nicholas Church, Tehran

Republic of Ireland
Church of St Nicholas Without, (Church of Ireland)
Church of St. Nicholas Within, Dublin
Church of St Nicholas of Myra Without, (Roman Catholic), Dublin
St. Nicholas Collegiate Church, Galway

Israel
Saint Nicholas Monastery, Jaffa

Italy
Basilica di San Nicola, Bari
San Nicola (Ottana)
Palmi Cathedral (Chiesa di San Nicola), Palmi
San Nicola, Pisa
San Nicola da Tolentino agli Orti Sallustiani, Rome
San Nicola in Carcere, Rome
San Nicola alla Carità

Kosovo
Saint Nicholas's Church (Drajčići)
Saint Nicholas's Church (Mušnikovo)

Latvia
St Nicholas Naval Cathedral, Karosta

Lithuania
St. Nicholas Church, Semeliškės
Church of St. Nicholas, Vilnius

Malta
St Nicholas and St Lucy Chapel, Rabat
Chapel of St Nicholas, Fort Ricasoli
St Nicholas Chapel, Mdina
Church of St Nicholas, Siġġiewi
Church of St Nicholas, Valletta
Chapel of St Nicholas, Żejtun
Chapel of St Nicholas, Żonqor

Monaco
Saint Nicholas Cathedral, Monaco

Netherlands
Basilica of St. Nicholas, Amsterdam
Ons' Lieve Heer op Solder
Oude Kerk (Amsterdam) or St. Nicholas Church, Amsterdam

North Macedonia
Church of St. Nicholas, Kumanovo
St Nicholas Church, Mavrovo

Poland
Cathedral of St. Nicholas, Bielsko-Biała
St. Nicholas Cathedral, Elbląg
St. Nicholas Church, Wysocice

Romania
St. Nicholas Church, Brașov
St. Nicholas Church, Brăila
St. Nicholas Church, Făgăraș
St. Nicholas Church, Orlat
St. Nicholas Church, Râșnov
St. Nicholas Church, Zărnești
New St. Nicholas Church, Focșani
Old St. Nicholas Church, Focșani
Stroe Church, Focșani
Tăbăcari Church, Focșani
Curtea de Argeș Cathedral

Russia
St. Nicholas Church (Buzhaninovo)
Church of St. Nicholas in Khamovniki, Moscow
Church of St. Nicholas in Tolmachi, Moscow
Saint Nicholas Cathedral, Novgorod
St. Nicholas Church, Taganrog

Serbia 
 Banja Monastery or St. Nicholas Church, Priboj
 Church of St. Nicholas, Kuršumlija
 Church of St. Nicholas, Prizren, Kosovo

Slovakia
St. Nicholas Church, Bratislava
Saint Nicholas Concathedral, Prešov
St Nicholas Church, Stará Ľubovňa
Saint Nicolas Church, Trnava

Slovenia
Ljubljana Cathedral
Novo Mesto Cathedral

Spain
San Nicolas Cathedral, Alicante
St Nicholas' Church, Madrid
St Nicholas' Church, Pamplona

Sweden
Saint Nicholas Church, Örebro
Storkyrkan, Stockholm

Switzerland
Fribourg Cathedral
Saint-Nicolas Church, Hérémence

Turkey
St. Nicholas Church, Demre

Ukraine
Kryvka Church, Lviv
St. Nicholas Military Cathedral (demolished), Kyiv 
St. Nicholas Roman Catholic Church, Kyiv

United Kingdom

England

Berkshire
St Nicolas Church, Newbury

Bristol
St Nicholas Church, Bristol

Cambridgeshire
St Nicholas Church, Kennett

Cheshire
St Nicholas Chapel, Chester
St Nicholas Chapel, Cholmondeley
St Nicholas Church, Burton

City of London
St Nicholas Cole Abbey

County Durham
St Nicholas Church, Durham

Dorset
St Nicholas's Church, Kimmeridge

East Sussex
St Nicholas Church, Brighton, Brighton, Brighton and Hove
St Nicholas Church, Iford
St Nicolas Church, Pevensey
St Nicolas Church, Portslade, Portslade, Brighton and Hove
Hastings Fishermen's Museum, Hastings ("The Fishermen's Church")

Essex
St. Nicholas Church, Berden
St Nicholas Church, Kelvedon Hatch

Gloucestershire
St Nicholas Church, Gloucester
St Nicholas Church, Hardwicke
St Nicholas of Myra's Church, Ozleworth

Greater London
St Nicholas Church, Chislehurst
St Nicholas Church, Chiswick
St Nicholas Church, Deptford
St Nicholas Church, Sutton
St Nicholas, Tooting Graveney

Hampshire
St Nicolas Church, North Stoneham
St Nicholas Church, Freefolk

Hertfordshire
St Nicholas Church, Harpenden
St Nicholas' Church, Stevenage

Isle of Wight
Church of St Nicholas in Castro, Carisbrooke

Kent
St Nicholas Church, Linton
St Nicholas Church, New Romney
St Nicholas Church, Rochester
St. Nicholas, Strood

Lancashire
St Nicholas Church, Fleetwood
St Nicholas Church, Newchurch
St Nicholas Church, Wrea Green

Leicester
St Nicholas Church, Leicester

Lincolnshire
St Nicholas Church, Normanton
St Nicholas' Church, South Ferriby

Merseyside
Greek Orthodox Church of St Nicholas, Toxteth, Liverpool
Church of Our Lady and Saint Nicholas, Liverpool
St Nicholas Church, St Helens, Sutton, St Helens
St Nicholas Church, Wallasey, Merseyside
St Nicholas Church, Whiston, Merseyside

Norfolk
St Nicholas Church, North Walsham, North Walsham
St Nicholas Church, Brandiston
St Nicholas Church, Buckenham
St Nicholas Church, Feltwell
St Nicholas Church, Gayton
St Nicholas Church, Great Yarmouth
 St Nicholas Chapel, King's Lynn
St Nicholas, Blakeney, in the deanery of Holt and the Diocese of Norwich

North Yorkshire
St Nicholas' Church, Askham Bryan
St Nicholas' Church, Dunnington
St. Nicholas's Church, Guisborough

Nottinghamshire
St Nicholas Church, Nottingham, Nottingham
St Nicholas Church, Littleborough

Oxfordshire
St Nicolas Church, Abingdon (formerly within Berkshire)

Shropshire
St Nicholas Church, Newport

South Yorkshire
St Nicholas Church, Bradfield, Sheffield

Surrey
Church of St Nicholas, Thames Ditton
St Nicolas Church, Guildford ("The Lower Church")

Thurrock
St. Nicholas of Myra, South Ockendon

Tyne and Wear
Newcastle Cathedral, Newcastle upon Tyne

Warwickshire
St Nicolas Church, Nuneaton
St Nicholas Church, Kenilworth

West Midlands (county)
St Nicolas Church, Kings Norton, Birmingham

West Sussex
St Nicholas Church, West Itchenor, Chichester
St Nicholas Church, Worth, Crawley
St Nicolas Church, Shoreham-by-Sea, Shoreham-by-Sea

Scotland
Kirk of St Nicholas, Aberdeen
St Nicholas' Cardonald Church, Glasgow

Wales
Church of St Nicholas, Trellech, Monmouthshire
St Nicholas Church, Church Stoke, Powys

United States
St. Nicholas Russian Orthodox Church (Juneau, Alaska)
St. Nicholas Russian Orthodox Church (Kwethluk, Alaska)
St. Nicholas Church (Nikolski, Alaska)
St. Nicholas Chapel (Nondalton, Alaska)
St. Nicholas Church (Pilot Point, Alaska)
St. Nicholas Chapel (Sand Point, Alaska)
St. Nicholas Chapel (Seldovia, Alaska)
St. Nicholas Greek Orthodox Cathedral (Tarpon Springs, Florida)
St. Nicholas Cathedral (Chicago), Illinois
St. Nicholas Catholic Church, Santa Claus, Indiana
St. Nicholas Orthodox Church and Rectory, Salem, Massachusetts
St. Nicholas of Tolentine Church, Atlantic City, New Jersey
St. Nicholas Catholic Church, in the Roman Catholic Diocese of Altoona–Johnstown, Nicktown, Pennsylvania
St. Nicholas Catholic Church (Passaic, New Jersey)
St. Nicholas Greek Orthodox Church (Manhattan), New York City, destroyed in the September 11, 2001 attacks and rebuilt in 2022
St. Nicholas Kirche (New York City), Manhattan, New York City, demolished 1960
Saint Nicholas Orthodox Church (Arkansas)
St. Nicholas Ukrainian Catholic Church, Watervliet, New York
St. Nicholas Catholic Church (Osgood, Ohio)
St. Nicholas Catholic Church (Zanesville, Ohio)
St. Nicholas Croatian Church (Millvale, Pennsylvania)
St. Nicholas Byzantine Catholic Church, Perryopolis, Pennsylvania
Former Saint Nicholas Croatian Catholic Church (Pittsburgh), Pennsylvania
Saint Nicholas Greek Orthodox Cathedral (Pittsburgh), Pennsylvania
St. Nicholas Cathedral (Washington, D.C.)

Uruguay
Saint Nicholas Greek Orthodox Church, Montevideo

See also 
 Basilica of Saint Nicholas (disambiguation)
 Cathedral of Saint Nicholas (disambiguation)